Scouting in Pennsylvania has a long and rich tradition, from 1908 to the present day, serving thousands of youth in programs that suit the environment in which they live.

History

Early history (1908–1950)
One of the earliest Scouting groups in Pennsylvania began in 1908 in Pottsville, when a Superintendent with the Pennsylvania State Police, Lynn G. Adams, formed a troop using Baden-Powell's handbook, Scouting for Boys. The troop was made up of two patrols, one sponsored by the Pottsville Mission and the other by the YMCA. Adams became the first Scoutmaster in Pennsylvania in 1910 soon after the BSA was incorporated. The oldest Pennsylvania Scout troop still in existence is "Troop Bala One" in Bala Cynwyd, which was founded in 1908 by Frank H. Sykes.

The first council in Pennsylvania was the Delaware & Montgomery County Council in 1911. This council eventually became the former Valley Forge Council, now part of the Cradle of Liberty Council.

Sixteen councils were chartered in America between 1910 and 1913. The seventeenth was the Warren County Council headquartered in Warren, Pennsylvania. This council later changed its name to Chief Cornplanter Council and is still in operation. It is currently the oldest existing, continuously registered council in America. The other preceding 16 councils either went out of business or merged with another council at some point in their history. The information for this paragraph was provided by the Registration Department of the National Office of the BSA, Irving, Texas, in October 2007.

Also in 1913, the Philadelphia Council opened the first American scout camp, Treasure Island Scout Reservation, near Point Pleasant. Two years later, Dr. E. Urner Goodman and Carrol Edson founded the Order of the Arrow, which inducted its first members on July 16, 1915 at Treasure Island.

In 1914, the Allegheny County Council, forerunner of today's Laurel Highlands Council, was chartered. Also in 1914, the Philadelphia Council was chartered.

In 1915 charters were first granted to the councils headquartered in Erie, Wilkes-Barre, and Oil City.

In 1916, councils were chartered in Reading, Lancaster, Harrisburg, and Scranton, among others. The council in Harrisburg is now part of New Birth of Freedom Council.

In 1917 Meadville, State College and Bethlehem were granted charters by the National Office, along with nine other councils.

1919 saw the councils in Williamsport, Altoona and Chester County formed. Like Chief Cornplanter, the Chester County Council is still in operation, one of only a handful of small one-county councils left in America. The other one in Pennsylvania, Bucks County Council, received its first charter in 1927.

By 1920, forty-six councils had been chartered in Pennsylvania. Most of these were small councils no larger than the town they were named after. Some of these were known as "Second Class Councils".

In the following years, other currently chartered councils were started: Juniata Valley in 1929; Bucktail in 1930; Columbia-Montour and Schuylkill County Area in 1931; and York-Adams in 1932.

1937 saw the formation of the current Westmoreland-Fayette Council in Greensburg.

All other current councils in Pennsylvania are the result of mergers which began to occur in the 1960s through the present day.

1941 saw the creation of Camp Ockanickon in Bucks County Council.

Among the claimants for First Boy Scout Troop in the United States is Troop 1 in Bala Cynwyd.

Pennsylvania is home to the oldest annual Scouting event in the nation, the Valley Forge Pilgrimage and Encampment.

In 1928, Eagle Scout (and Erie native) Paul Siple was one of the first Scouts to travel to Antarctica with Admiral Richard Byrd. Byrd had held a national contest to invite worthy Eagle Scouts onto the expedition. Paul Siple later went on to develop what is now known as the "Wind Chill Factor"

The 1921 and 1931 National Order of the Arrow Lodge Meetings were held at Philadelphia, the 1922 and 1927 National Lodge Meetings were held at Reading, and the 1940 National Lodge Meeting was held at Ligonier.

In 1924, the McKean County Council (#499) was formed, changing its name to the McKean-Potter Area Council (#499) in 1926. In 1936, the council changed its name to the McKean-Potter Area Council (#499) in 1936. In 1947, the council changed its name to the Elk Lick Council (#499).

Recent history (1950–1990)
The 1950 National Scout Jamboree was held at Valley Forge. That positive experience led to National Jamborees in 1957 and 1964 as well.

Outside of the few small councils mentioned above, the history of Pennsylvania councils over the past 50 years has been one of mergers.

Beginning in 1962, the Mid-Valley Council, headquartered in Peckville, merged with the former Dan Beard Council in Scranton to form the Forest Lakes Council. Meanwhile, in 1970, the former Anthracite Council (Hazleton) merged with the former Wyoming Valley Council (Wilkes-Barre) to form the Penn Mountains Council. In 1984, the area comprising the former Anthracite Council removed itself from the Penn Mountains Council and joined neighboring Minsi Trails Council. Forest Lakes Council and Penn Mountains Council merged in 1990 to form the current Northeastern Pennsylvania Council, in Moosic.

In 1967, the former Nemacolin Trails Council in Washington, Pennsylvania, merged with the Allegheny Council in Pittsburgh to become the Allegheny Trails Council. This council merged again in 1993 with East Valley Council to become the Greater Pittsburgh Council.

In 1969, the Lehigh County Council (Allentown), Bethlehem Area Council and Delaware Valley Area Council (Easton) merged to form the current Minsi Trails Council in Allentown.

In 1970, the former Appalachian Trail Council and Daniel Boone Council merged to form the current Hawk Mountain Council in Reading. 1970 also saw the merger of the Blair-Bedford Area Council (Altoona), William Penn Council (Indiana) and Admiral Robert E. Peary Council (Johnstown) into the Penns Woods Council in Ebensburg.

In 1971, the Lancaster County and Lebanon County councils merged to form the Lancaster-Lebanon Council. This council changed its name in 1995 to the Pennsylvania Dutch Council and is headquartered in Lancaster.

In 1972, the Washington Trail Council (Erie), Colonel Drake Council (Oil City) and Custaloga Council (Sharon) merged to form the current French Creek Council, headquartered in Erie.

1973 saw the merger of the former Lawrence County Council (New Castle) with the former Pioneer Trails Council (Butler), forming the current Moraine Trails Council, host to two National Jamborees (see below).

Also in 1973, the former Elk Lick Council, in Bradford, merged into the Allegheny Highlands Council headquartered in Falconer, New York.

In 1974, the former West Branch Council (Williamsport) and Susquehanna Valley Area Council (Sunbury) merged to form the current Susquehanna Council in Williamsport.

In 1973, the Allegheny Highlands Council (#382) was formed from a merger of the Seneca Council (#750) and the Elk Lick Council (#499).

Other notable happenings in Pennsylvania Scouting at this time include:

The 1950, 1957, and 1964 National Scout Jamborees were held at Valley Forge.

Half of the 1973 National Scout Jamboree ("Jamboree East") was held at Moraine State Park in Butler County, where the 1977 National Scout Jamboree and Campaganza 2010 were also held.

During 1975 and 1976, Scouts in the Philadelphia area could earn a "Colonial Philadelphia" merit badge. It could only be counted towards palms, not any rank, and came in a green border and a very yellow-green border. This was the only time BSA National approved a regional merit badge for any such use.

Boy Scouts of America in Pennsylvania today

Bucktail Council

Camps
Camp Mountain Run

Order of the Arrow
Ah'Tic Lodge #139

Chester County Council

The Chester County Council is a Boy Scouts of America service council that serves members of the Cub Scouts, Scouts BSA, and Venturing programs in Chester County, Pennsylvania and Northeastern Cecil County, Maryland.

Camps
Camp Ware (Peach Bottom, Pennsylvania)
Camp Horseshoe (Rising Sun, Maryland)

Order of the Arrow
Octoraro Lodge #22

Chief Cornplanter Council

Known as "America's Oldest Council," CCC is the oldest existing, continuously registered council in the United States. In 1910, members of the community of Warren first explored Scouting activities. In 1913, the Boy Scouts of America gave a charter to an organization known as the Warren County Council. Then in 1954 the council's official name was changed to Chief Cornplanter Council to honor the famous Seneca-Iroquois war chief and diplomat. In 2013, the council celebrated its 100th anniversary as the longest-tenured, unmerged Boy Scout Council in America.

Camps
Camp Olmsted

Order of the Arrow
Gyantwachia Lodge #255

Columbia-Montour Council

Columbia-Mountour Council is headquartered in Bloomsburg. It serves Columbia and Montour counties. The council operates Camp Lavigne with an office at 35 Camp Lavigne Road, Benton. During the summer season Camp Lavigne conducts a Boy Scout summer camp program, Cub Scout and Webelos Scout resident program, as well as a Cub Day Camp program.  During the non-summer season, Camp Lavigne hosts a Klondike Derby, Cub Winter Fun Day, Orienteering Competition, Cub Skill Weekend, and Haunted Harvest Fest.  The council's Order of the Arrow lodge is Wyona Lodge #18.

Cradle of Liberty Council

The Cradle of Liberty Council (#525) is a Boy Scouts of America council created in 1996 with the merger of the former Philadelphia Council (covering the city and county of Philadelphia) and the former Valley Forge Council (covering Delaware and Montgomery counties).

Camps
 Resica Falls Scout Reservation (East Stroudsburg)
Musser Scout Reservation (Marlborough Township)
Treasure Island Scout Reservation (closed)

Order of the Arrow
Unami Lodge #1

French Creek Council

The French Creek Council serves scouts in six counties in northwestern Pennsylvania and Brookfield Township in Ohio. The council was organized in 1972 from a merger of the former Washington Trail Council of Erie, Custaloga Council of Sharon, and Colonel Drake Council of Oil City. Its headquarters is located in Erie, PA. The council is divided into three districts, Oliver Perry, Colonel Drake and Chief Kiondashawa, to effectively execute operations across  Northwest Pennsylvania.

Camps 
 Custaloga Town Scout Reservation (Carlton)

Order of the Arrow
Langundowi Lodge #46

Hawk Mountain Council

The Hawk Mountain Council serves Berks, Schuylkill, and Carbon counties in Pennsylvania. The council has headquarters near Reading, PA. The Council was formed in 1970 with the merger of the Appalachian Trail and Daniel Boone councils.

Camps 
Hawk Mountain Scout Reservation

Order of the Arrow
Kittatinny Lodge #5

Juniata Valley Council

Blair, Huntingdon, Mifflin, Center, Juniata Counties

Camps
Seven Mountains Scout Camp

Order of the Arrow
Monaken Lodge #103

Laurel Highlands Council

Laurel Highlands Council serves youth in Allegheny, Beaver, Bedford, Blair, Cambria, Greene, Indiana, Somerset, and Washington counties in Pennsylvania; Grant, Hampshire, Hardy, and Mineral counties in West Virginia; and Allegany and Garrett counties of Maryland.
Laurel Highlands Council was formed when the Greater Pittsburgh and Penn's Woods Councils merged in 2011. Potomac Council was then added in 2014.

Camps 
Camp Anawanna
Camp Baker
Camp Guyasuta
Heritage Reservation (containing camps Liberty, Freedom, Eagle Base, and Independence)
Camp Potomac
Camp Seph Mack
Camp Twin Echo. (1928-2020) closed July 2020

Order of the Arrow 
Allohak Menewi Lodge 57

Minsi Trails Council

Minsi Trails Council serves Scouts of eastern Pennsylvania's Lehigh Valley and Pocono regions as well as parts of western New Jersey. The council serves six counties: Lehigh, Northampton, Monroe, Carbon, Luzerne, and Warren.

The council was formed in 1969, after the merger of the Bethlehem Area, Delaware Valley Area, and Lehigh councils. The council consists of six districts and maintains two camping properties: Camp Minsi in Pocono Summit, and Trexler Scout Reservation in Jonas.

Districts
Anthracite District
Forks of Delaware District
North Valley District
Pocono District
South Mountain District
Trexler District

On January 1, 2021 Minsi Trails Council realigned its districts by counties to form Carbon-Luzerne District, Lehigh District, Monroe District, Northampton District, and Warren District.

Camps
Camp Minsi (Pocono Summit, Pennsylvania)
Trexler Scout Reservation (Jonas, Pennsylvania)

Order of the Arrow
Witauchsoman Lodge #44

Moraine Trails Council

Districts
Glacier Ridge District (Butler) 
King Beaver District (Lawrence)
River Valley District (Armstrong/NW Westmoreland Counties)

Camps
Camp Agawam 
Camp Bucoco

Order of the Arrow
Kuskitannee Lodge #168

New Birth of Freedom Council

The New Birth of Freedom Council serves south-central Pennsylvania. The council was formed by a merger of the York-Adams Area Council and Keystone Area Council on April 1, 2010.

Northeastern Pennsylvania Council

Northeastern Pennsylvania Council, with headquarters in Moosic, formed in 1990 from the merger of the Forest Lakes and Penn Mountains councils. The council serves units in Lackawanna, Luzerne, Pike, Wayne, and Wyoming counties. Its Order of the Arrow lodge is Lowwapaneu Lodge #191. It has two districts: Two Mountains and Dan Beard. The council operates two camps: Goose Pond Scout Reservation and Camp Acahela. Since its founding the council has conducted a biennial Traveling Camporee that takes Scouts to camp at locations that rotate among Williamsburg, Virginia, Baltimore Maryland, Boston, Massachusetts, Niagara Falls, New York, and Pittsburgh, Pennsylvania.

Camps
 Camp Acahela
 Goose Pond Scout Reservation

Pennsylvania Dutch Council

The council has two districts: Iron Forge and Susquehanna.

Camps-
Bashore Scout Reservation
J. Edward Mack Scout Reservation

Order of the Arrow
Wunita Gokhos Lodge #39

Susquehanna Council

Camps
Camp Karoondinha (Glen Iron)

Order of the Arrow
Woapeu Sisilija Lodge #343

Washington Crossing Council

The Washington Crossing Council (formerly Bucks County Council)mserves Bucks County, Pennsylvania, Hunterdon County, NJ, and Mercer County, NJ.

Westmoreland-Fayette Council
The Westmoreland Fayette Council was formed in 1937. The council is made up of three districts, Old Trails District based primarily out of Fayette County, Bushy Run District based primarily in Westmoreland County along with Laurel Hills District also based primarily in Westmoreland County. Throughout the time in which the council has been serving there have been 6 different districts. These districts were Braddock Trails, Bushy Run, Chestnut Ridge, Forbes, Laurel Hills, and Old Trails Districts.

Camps
 Camp Conestoga
Camp Buck Run
Camp Tenacharison

Past camps
Camp Wesco
Camp Wildwood
Camp Pleasant
Camp Paul Bunyan

Order of the Arrow
Wagion Lodge #6

Non-Pennsylvania-based Boy Scout councils

Allegheny Highlands Council

Baden-Powell Council

Five Rivers Council

Potomac Council

Mason-Dixon Council

Girl Scouting today

Girl Scouts in the Heart of Pennsylvania
Girl Scouts in the Heart of Pennsylvania was formed on May 1, 2007 through the merger of Hemlock (Harrisburg), Penn Laurel (York), Penn's Woods (Wilkes-Barre), and Scranton-Pocono (Scranton) Girl Scout councils.

Camps
Camp Archbald (Susquehanna County)
 Camp Echo Trail (York County)
 Camp Happy Valley (Adams County)
 Camp Furnace Hills (Lancaster County)
 Camp Golden Pond (Huntingdon County)
 Camp Small Valley (Dauphin County)

Girl Scouts of Eastern Pennsylvania
 Girl Scouts of Eastern Pennsylvania was created by a merger on April 28, 2007 between the Girl Scouts of Freedom Valley, Southeastern Pennsylvania, and Great Valley Councils. The merger became effective on May 1. Girl Scouts of Eastern Pennsylvania serves Berks, Bucks, Carbon, Chester, Delaware, Lehigh, Montgomery, Northampton, and Philadelphia counties.

Camps
 Camp Mosey Wood (Carbon County)
Camp Mosey Wood is open for year-round camping, as well as residential summer camp for girls entering 1-12th grade. The camp features a 13-acre lake, high adventure elements, archery, a dueling zip line across the lake, and many hiking trails.
 Camp Wood Haven (Schuylkill County)
 Camp Mountain House (Lehigh Valley)
 Camp Laughing Waters (Gilbertsville)
 Shelly Ridge Day Camp (Miquon)
 Valley Forge Day Camp (Valley Forge)

Past camps
 Camp Hidden Falls (Dingmans Ferry)
 Camp Tohikanee (Quakertown)
 Camp Tweedale (Oxford)

Divesting in camps
According to a June 16, 2011 report, the council has decided to divest in Camp Tweedale, Camp Tohikanee, and Camp Hidden Falls.
Camp Hidden Falls closed in 2012, while Camp Tweedale and Camp Tohikanee closed in 2015.
 In 2018, Hidden Falls became a part of the National Park Service's Delaware Water Gap National Recreation Area. Camp Tweedale was sold to the Chester Water Authority in 2016.

Girl Scouts Western Pennsylvania
The Western Pennsylvania Council was formed through the merger of five regional councils: Keystone, Girl Scouts of Beaver and Lawrence Counties, Girl Scouts of Penn Lakes Council, Girl Scouts of Talus Rock Council and Girl Scouts-Trillium Council.

Camps
 Camp Conshatawba (Ebensburg)
 Camp Redwing (Renfrew)
 Camp Skymeadow (Avonmore)

Non-Pennsylvania-based Girl Scout councils

Girl Scouts of NYPENN Pathways

Scouting museums
The World of Scouting Museum is located in Valley Forge. The Museum holds a special exhibit each President's Day weekend during the Cradle of Liberty Council, BSA's Valley Forge Pilgrimage.

International Scouting units
 There are Homenetmen Armenian Scouts in Philadelphia.
 Külföldi Magyar Cserkészszövetség Hungarian Scouting maintains two troops in Philadelphia and one in Pittsburgh.

See also

Notes

References

Youth organizations based in Pennsylvania
Pennsylvania
Northeast Region (Boy Scouts of America)